The 17221 / 22 Kakinada Port–Lokmanya Tilak Terminus Express is an Express train belonging to Indian Railways South Coast Railway zone that runs between  and  in India.

It operates as train number 17221 from Kakinada Port to Lokmanya Tilak Terminus and as train number 17222 in the reverse direction serving the states of  Andhra Pradesh, Telangana, Karnataka & Maharashtra.

Coaches
The 17221 / 22 Kakinada Port–Lokmanya Tilak Terminus Express has two AC 2 tier, two AC 3 tier, six sleeper class, six general unreserved & two SLR (seating with luggage rake) coaches. It does not carry a pantry car.

As is customary with most train services in India, coach composition may be amended at the discretion of Indian Railways depending on demand.

Service

Routing

Traction
As the route is going to electrification, a Kalyan-based diesel locomotive WDM-3A twins, WDP-3A or WDG-4D pulls the train from Lokmanya Tilak Terminus until Secundurabad handing over to Vijayawada-based WAP-4 towards remaining part of the journey until Kakinada Port.

References

Transport in Mumbai
Rail transport in Maharashtra
Rail transport in Andhra Pradesh
Rail transport in Telangana
Rail transport in Karnataka
Transport in Kakinada
Express trains in India